Filip Čurlevski (born 22 February 1992) is a Macedonian handball player who plays for Sjundeå IF and the Macedonian national team.

He represented Macedonia at the 2019 World Men's Handball Championship.

References

1992 births
Living people
Macedonian male handball players
Sportspeople from Bitola